Iuri Gabiskiria (born 1 September 1968) is a Georgian former professional footballer. He made his professional debut in the Soviet Second League in 1988 for FC Torpedo Kutaisi. He played 2 games in the UEFA Cup 2006–07 for FC Ameri Tbilisi.

References

1968 births
Living people
Soviet footballers
Footballers from Georgia (country)
Georgia (country) international footballers
Expatriate footballers from Georgia (country)
Russian Premier League players
Ukrainian Premier League players
FC Kryvbas Kryvyi Rih players
FC Shakhtar Donetsk players
FC KAMAZ Naberezhnye Chelny players
FC Kuban Krasnodar players
Bnei Sakhnin F.C. players
PFC Spartak Nalchik players
Expatriate footballers in Israel
Expatriate footballers in Ukraine
Expatriate sportspeople from Georgia (country) in Ukraine
FC Slavyansk Slavyansk-na-Kubani players
Association football forwards
Association football midfielders